The Arnprior Packers are a Junior "B" ice hockey team in Arnprior, Ontario.  They were also once members of the CJHL (now the CCHL) before joining the Ottawa Valley Junior Hockey League in 1967.
Between 2014-15 and the end of the 2019-2020 seasons, the EOJHL and the CCHL set a new agreement  in an attempt to create a better player development model. This resulted in the league re-branding itself as the Central Canada Hockey League Tier 2 (CCHL2), and shrinking to 16 teams and two divisions. The league reverted to the Eastern Ontario Junior Hockey League for 2021.

History

The Arnprior Packers have captured 4 Valley Division Championships, the first in 1980, followed by titles in 1995, 1998 and most recently during the 2011-12 Season where they beat the Perth Blue Wings in 5 games.  The Packers have also captured 3 Boxing Day Tournament Titles, the Boxing Day Tournament has since been changed to the EOJHL Fall Classic which the Packers successfully hosted during the 2012-13 Season.

Following the 2022 season the league approved the sale of the Packers to the Shift Performance and Wellness organization.

Season-by-season results

External links
Arnprior Packers Website
CCHL2 Webpage

Eastern Ontario Junior Hockey League teams
Ice hockey clubs established in 1965
1965 establishments in Ontario